There are at least 41 named lakes and reservoirs in St. Francis County, Arkansas.

Lakes
Beaty Lake (Arkansas), el.  
Beaver Lake, el.  
Beaver Lake, el.  
Big Bear Lake, el.  
Big Lake, el.  
Blackfish Lake, el.  
Brushy Lake, el.  
Burnt Cane Lake, el.  
Bushy Lake, el.  
Don Lake, el.  
Donahue Lake, el.  
Fishing Lake, el.  
Horseshoe Lake, el.  
Horseshoe Lake, el.  
Island Lake, el.  
Kiethley Lake, el.  
Little Bear Lake, el.  
Long Lake, el.  
Long Lake, el.  
Mud Lake, el.  
 Nichols Lake, el.  
 Old River, el.  
 Pettijohn Lake, el.  
 Round Pond, el.  
 Round Pond Lake, el.  
 Rush Lake, el.  
 Shell Lake, el.  
 Skinny Lake, el.  
 Taylor Lake, el.  
 Thompson Lake, el.  
 Wiggins Lake, el.

Reservoirs
Cole Lake, el.  
Forest Lake Number 3, el.  
Forest Lake Number 4, el.  
Forest Lake Number 5, el.  
Forest Lake Number 6, el.  
Hickey Lake, el.  
Lake Saint Francis, el.  
Loeb Lake, el.  
Scenic Hills Lake, el.  
Telico Lake, el.

See also
 List of lakes in Arkansas

Notes

Bodies of water of St. Francis County, Arkansas
St. Francis